The Golden Jacket is a greyhound racing competition held at Crayford Stadium. It was inaugurated in 1975 at Harringay Stadium but following the closure of the track switched to Hall Green Stadium and then Monmore Green Stadium before finding a home at Crayford.

Past winners

Venues & Distances 
1975–1984 (Harringay, 660m)
1985–1985 (Hall Green, 663m)
1986–1986 (Monmore, 647m)
1987–present (Crayford, 714m)

Sponsors
1987–2021 (Ladbrokes)
2022–present (Premier Greyhound Racing)

References

Greyhound racing competitions in the United Kingdom
Sport in the London Borough of Bexley
Recurring sporting events established in 1975
Greyhound racing in London